Mbocayaty (Guaraní: Mbokajaty) is a town in the Guairá Department of Paraguay.

Sources 
World Gazeteer: Paraguay – World-Gazetteer.com

Populated places in the Guairá Department